This is a list of Tempest sailboat championships.

Olympics 
Reference

World Championships 
Reference

European Championships 
Reference

European championships were only held when a World Championship was held outside the European continent. After 1980 no further European championships were held.

References

Tempest (keelboat)